Marko Turina (born 23 January 1937) is Croatian cardiac surgeon. He was the Director of Klinik für Herzgefasschirurgie, University Hospital of Zurich in Zurich, Switzerland. He was one of the first people to insert an artificial heart outside the chest and among the first people to operate on congenital heart defects. Marko Turina is considered as a surgeon of high international prestige.

Biography
Marko Turina was born in Zagreb. He was a great student, but because Communist Party of Yugoslavia declared him a bourgeois he had no future in SFR Yugoslavia. At first Communists sent him to Banja Luka to serve in the Army. His wish to attend Belgrade Academy for Medical Officers was denied. After that he decided to leave Yugoslavia. He was considered as political emigrant because of his anti-Communist attitudes. He went to Switzerland where he found a job at University hospital of Zürich in 1964 under Ake Senning. In 1985 he became chef of Center for Heart and Blood Vessels Diseases. He was retired in 2004, despite his ambitions to continue his career. His retirement came shortly after the death of a patient he and his team operated on, the patient was transplanted a heart of non-compatible blood type. He is still active, he teaches about cardiac surgery around the World.

References

1937 births
Living people
Physicians from Zagreb
School of Medicine, University of Zagreb alumni
Swiss people of Croatian descent
Croatian cardiac surgeons